Leucopogon denticulatus is a species of flowering plant in the heath family Ericaceae and is endemic to the south-west of Western Australia. It is an erect shrub with hairy young branchlets, overlapping egg-shaped leaves with small teeth on the edges and white, tube-shaped flowers.

Description
The leaves are arranged in opposite pairs, forming 4 rows along the stems. The flowers are arranged in short spikes near the ends of branches with leaf-like bracts and bracteoles. Flowering occurs from July to November, and the fruit is a drupe containing a single seed.

Taxonomy and naming
Leucopogon denticulatus was first formally described in 1905 by William Vincent Fitzgerald in the Journal of the West Australian Natural History Society from specimens collected by Cecil Rollo Payton Andrews near Albany in 1903. The specific epithet (denticulatus) means "denticulate".

Distribution and habitat
This leucopogon grows on sandplains and salt flats in the Esperance Plains, Jarrah Forest and Mallee bioregions of south-western Western Australia.

Conservation status
Leucopogon denticulatus is classified as "not threatened" by the Western Australian Government Department of Biodiversity, Conservation and Attractions.

References

denticulatus
Ericales of Australia
Flora of Western Australia
Plants described in 1905
Taxa named by William Vincent Fitzgerald